Richard Caspar Sarafian (April 28, 1930 – September 18, 2013) was an Armenian-American film director and actor. He compiled a versatile career that spanned over five decades as a director, actor, and writer. Sarafian is best known as the director of the 1971 film Vanishing Point and the classic The Twilight Zone episode "Living Doll".

Biography
Sarafian was born in New York City on April 28, 1930, to Armenian immigrants. He studied pre-law and pre-med at New York University and was a poor student, but changed over to studying film, at which he excelled. He left college to join the United States Army, in which he served as a reporter for an Army news service. While stationed in Kansas City, Missouri, during the Korean War (1950–1953) he met the future Hollywood director Robert Altman, and the two became friends.

Sarafian worked with Altman on industrial films and married Altmans sister, Helen Joan Altman. He also acted in a local play Altman directed. His television career began in the early 1960s in Kansas City as Altmans assistant. Sarafian soon began to direct television shows himself, and in 1963 scored one of his greatest successes as director of the "Living Doll" episode of The Twilight Zone. His first feature film was Andy in 1965. His greatest success as a feature film director came with Vanishing Point, an existential road movie that followed a man driving a white Dodge Challenger from Denver, Colorado, to San Francisco, California, in 15 hours; critics disliked the movie but it became a cult hit.

Besides The Twilight Zone, Sarafians directing credits on television included episodes of the television series Gunsmoke and Batman. In addition to Andy and Vanishing Point, he directed a number of feature films, including Run Wild, Run Free in 1969, Man in the Wilderness in 1971, and The Man Who Loved Cat Dancing in 1973. In his film acting career, he played a gangster in Bugsy in 1991 and a hitman in Bulworth in 1998, and in 2001 he voiced the animated God Beaver character in Dr. Dolittle 2. On television, he played a coffee shop owner as a regular member of the cast of the 1985–1986 CBS situation comedy Foley Square, starring Margaret Colin.

Personal life
Sarafian and Helen Altman Sarafian married, divorced, and remarried; she died in 2011. They had five children, including actor Richard Sarafian Jr., actor/director Deran Sarafian, special effects expert Damon B. Sarafian, screenwriter Tedi Sarafian, and Catherine Sarafian.

Death
Sarafian died at the age of 83 in Santa Monica, California, on September 18, 2013, of pneumonia, which he contracted while recovering from a broken back.

Filmography

Actor

Film

Television

Director

Film

Television

Awards
Nominee, Gold Hugo, Best Feature Film – Chicago International Film Festival (The Next Man) (1976)

References

External links
 
 

1930 births
2013 deaths
Film directors from New York City
American male film actors
American male television actors
American television directors
American male screenwriters
American people of Armenian descent
Deaths from pneumonia in California
20th-century American male actors
21st-century American male actors